Shantha Kalavitigoda (born December 23, 1977, Colombo) is a former Sri Lankan cricketer who played in one Test in 2005. He was educated at Nalanda College Colombo. He made his Twenty20 debut on 17 August 2004, for Colts Cricket Club in the 2004 SLC Twenty20 Tournament.

Shantha is the 101st Sri Lanka Test Cap [New Zealand Vs Sri Lanka at Wellington New Zealand 2004/05]

References

External links
 Records to be shattered
 Leslie Narangoda top sportsman an article written by PREMASARA Epasinghe

1977 births
Living people
Sri Lanka Test cricketers
Sri Lankan cricketers
Basnahira North cricketers
Alumni of Nalanda College, Colombo
North Central Province cricketers